The 2016–17 South African Premier Division season (known as the ABSA Premiership for sponsorship reasons) is the 21st season of the Premier Soccer League since its establishment in 1996.

Mamelodi Sundowns were the defending champions, having won the previous 2015–16 South African Premier Division (PSL) season. The season featured 14 teams from the 2015–16 season and two new teams promoted from the 2015–16 National First Division: Baroka and Highlands Park who replace relegated Jomo Cosmos and University of Pretoria. Highlands Park promotion was won via the PSL Playoff Tournament. Cape Town City bought over the franchise of Mpumalanga Black Aces and relocated from Mbombela Stadium to Cape Town Stadium. The sale of Free State Stars franchise to Moroka Swallows fell through.

Teams

Stadiums and locations

Football teams in South Africa tend to use multiple stadiums over the course of a season for their home games. The following table will only indicate the stadium used most often by the club for their home games.

Personnel and kits

Managerial changes

League table

Standings

Positions by round

Results

Season statistics

Scoring

Top scorers

Hat-tricks

References

External links
Premier Soccer League (PSL) Official Website
ABSA Premiership
PSL Results
PSL Standings

2016–17 in African association football leagues
1
2016–17